The Cross-Harbour Tunnel (abbreviated CHT or XHT) is the first tunnel in Hong Kong built underwater. It consists of two steel road tunnels each with two lanes constructed using the single shell immersed tube method.

It is the earliest of three vehicular harbour crossings in Hong Kong, opened for traffic in 1972. It was constructed under a 30-year private-sector franchise based on a build–operate–transfer model, and the title passed to the Hong Kong government in 1999 upon termination of the franchise. It has become one of the most congested roads in Hong Kong and the world, with 116,753 vehicles passing through it daily in 2013.

History

The Hong Kong government used the operator model "Build Operate Transfer", or "BOT", for the implementation of the tunnel project; Financing and construction was the responsibility of a private enterprise, which was granted a concession to operate and collect tolls for 30 years. The concession was given to the then Cross-Harbour Tunnel Company Limited, today the Cross-Harbour Holdings Limited, which was founded in 1965 to carry out the tunnel project. The Hong Kong government participated to 20% in order not to fully hand over their influence on the project. The tunnel was designed with two lanes for each direction of travel for a capacity of 80,000 vehicles. The project was structurally managed jointly by the British engineering firms Scott Wilson Kirkpatrick & Partners and Freeman Fox & Partners. The tunnel links the main financial and commercial districts on both sides of Victoria Harbour, connecting Kellett Island (a former island now connected to Hong Kong Island by reclamation), with a reclaimed site on the western side of Hung Hom Bay, Kowloon, off then Hong Kong Technical College. The toll plaza is located at the Hung Hom end of the tunnel, and has 14 toll booths. It provides the first road link and the first link for land transport between Kowloon and Hong Kong Island. Prior to the opening of the tunnel, cross-harbour vehicular traffic depended on ferries and for passengers, the Star Ferry. The project was joint-engineered by Scott Wilson Kirkpatrick & Partners and Freeman Fox & Partners.

Construction began in September 1969 and was to last four years. The concession period ran from the start of construction, and the operator accordingly completed the construction one year faster than planned. On 2 August 1972, the tunnel was opened for traffic, charging HK$5 per car crossing. After just three and a half years of operation, the operator had recouped the construction costs.

In 1984, the Hong Kong Government introduced a tax in addition to the operator's toll to make the overcrowded tunnel less priced. The price for a car transit was now HK$10.

In 1993, an electronic toll collection system was installed. Together with measures to control the flow of traffic, the vehicle capacity could be increased.

It was administered by The Cross-Harbour Tunnel Company Ltd until August 1999, when the operation franchise agreement expired and the government assumed control. From 1 November 2010, the tunnel was managed, operated and maintained by Serco on a contract basis. The tunnel is currently operated by Chun Wo Tunnel Management Limited, which was awarded a contract lasting from 2016 to 2022.

The 2017 Hong Kong action film Shock Wave, starring Andy Lau, set its main plot in the tunnel.

In November 2019, Hong Kong protesters set roadblocks across the northern tunnel entrance and set fire to tollbooths, as many roads around the Polytechnic University were blocked, leading to the closure of the tunnel for a dozen of days.

Fees

The tunnel generates approximately HK$700 million in annual toll revenue.

Transport

, there are 44 bus routes passing through the tunnel.

See also
 Vehicular harbour crossings in Hong Kong
 List of tunnels and bridges in Hong Kong
 Megaproject

References

External links

 Cross-Harbour Tunnel By-laws (chapter 2301, Laws of Hong Kong) [1984 Ed.], c/o University of Hong Kong.

Road tunnels in Hong Kong
Hung Hom
Causeway Bay
Victoria Harbour
Undersea tunnels in Asia
Route 1 (Hong Kong)
Tunnels completed in 1972
Immersed tube tunnels in Hong Kong
1972 establishments in Hong Kong
Toll tunnels in Hong Kong